Manhattan Madness may refer to: 

 Manhattan Madness (1916 film), a silent American film directed by Allan Dwan
 Manhattan Madness (1925 film), a silent American film directed by John McDermott